Senjan (also Romanized as Senjān; also known as Senījān, Zenjān, Fenjān, and Fījān) was a city in the Central District of Arak County, Markazi Province, Iran.  At the 2006 census, its population was 10,592, in 2,897 families. The city was reorganized as part of Arak, becoming Arak Municipality district 5.

References

Populated places in Arak County

Cities in Markazi Province